Slave bracelet may refer to:
 A copper bracelet used as a medium of exchange in the West African slave trade, see Manillas.
 Any bracelet made of chain links.
 Hand chains, an Arabic wrist bracelet joined to a ring by a chain.
 A bracelet worn by a slave (this meaning comes from BDSM fiction, e.g. John Norman's Gor series of novels; in this context, it may be a colloquial term for handcuffs).

Slave bracelets are a piece of jewelry associated with several cultures. As it refers to the hand adornment often worn by belly dancers or associated with harem jewelry, the slave bracelet or hand chain consists of a bracelet that attaches to a ring via a chain, bejeweled links, or other ornate hand connector along the back of the hand. They have been a popular accessory worn by members of the  Gothic subculture as well as those of the BDSM community, specifically dominant–submissive couples as a symbol of ownership between master (BDSM) and slave (BDSM).

Bracelets